The canton of Digoin is an administrative division of the Saône-et-Loire department, eastern France. Its borders were modified at the French canton reorganisation which came into effect in March 2015. Its seat is in Digoin.

It consists of the following communes:
 
Bourbon-Lancy
Chalmoux
Cronat
Digoin
Gilly-sur-Loire
Les Guerreaux
Lesme
Maltat
Mont
La Motte-Saint-Jean
Perrigny-sur-Loire
Saint-Agnan
Saint-Aubin-sur-Loire
Varenne-Saint-Germain
Vitry-sur-Loire

References

Cantons of Saône-et-Loire